Richard Fishlock (born 17 August 1936) is a British rower. He competed in the men's eight event at the 1960 Summer Olympics.

References

1936 births
Living people
British male rowers
Olympic rowers of Great Britain
Rowers at the 1960 Summer Olympics
Sportspeople from Kampala